Cystoseira foeniculacea is a species of brown alga in the genus Cystoseira.

Description
It has many cryptostomata, and conceptacles that may be male, female or both. Up to 12 oogonia may develop in each conceptacle. The proximity of the oogonia and the antheridia strongly suggest that C. foeniculacea self-fertilises.

Distribution
Cystoseira foeniculacea is found in the mid-littoral zone and in other sheltered places, from the British Isles to Senegal, and in the Mediterranean Sea.

Taxonomy
Cystoseira foeniculacea was first described by Carl Linnaeus in his seminal 1753 work Species Plantarum, under the name "Fucus foeniculaceus". Three other species described by Linnaeus were also later determined to refer to the same species by Dawson Turner, who chose the epithet "foeniculacea" as the valid name (under the "principle of the first reviser"). The vernacular name "bushy feather wrack" has been proposed for this species.

References

External links

Linnaeus' original description, in Species Plantarum

Fucales
Species described in 1753
Taxa named by Carl Linnaeus